Daniel James Francis Shilvock (born 22 November 1983) is an English cricketer. Shilvock is a right-handed batsman who bowls leg break. He was born in Birmingham, Warwickshire.

While studying for his degree at Durham University, Shilvock made his first-class debut for Durham UCCE against Somerset in 2005. That same year he was selected, alongside Alistair Maiden, to train with the World Cricket Academy in India. He made a further first-class appearance in 2006, against Surrey. In his two first-class matches for the university, he took 3 wickets at an average of 41.33, with best figures of 2/77. With the bat, he scored 15 runs.

Shilvock has also played Minor counties cricket, starting with Herefordshire who he made three Minor Counties Championship appearances for in 2005. For the 2006 season, he joined Berkshire. To date, he has made 14 Minor Counties Championship appearances and a single MCCA Knockout Trophy appearance.

References

External links
Daniel Shilvock at ESPNcricinfo

1983 births
Living people
Cricketers from Birmingham, West Midlands
English cricketers
Durham MCCU cricketers
Herefordshire cricketers
Berkshire cricketers
Alumni of the College of St Hild and St Bede, Durham
English cricketers of the 21st century